Redbone is the first (double) album by Native American rock band Redbone.
In Europe it was also released as a single record. The double album contains 4 instrumentals, 3 of which are extended.

The album contains their version of the 1967 hit they wrote for P.J. Proby, "Niki Hoeky". The track appears on the album as "Niki Hokey".

Track listing

Side one
"Crazy Cajun Cakewalk Band" (Lolly Vegas/Patrick Vegas/Jim Ford) – 3:06
"Prehistoric Rhythm" (L.Vegas) – 3:50
"Niki Hokey" (L. Vegas/P. Vegas/J. Ford) – 3:17
"Promise I Won't Let It Show" (P. Vegas) – 3:06
"Minor Seven Heaven" (L. Vegas) - 4:17

Side two
"Night Come Down" (L. Vegas) – 3:53
"Tennessee Girl" (L. Vegas) – 2:27
"Rebecca" (L. Vegas) – 3:02
"Jambone (Instrumental)" (P. Vegas/L. Vegas/R. Anthony Bellamy/Peter DePoe) – 7:50

Side three
"Little Girl" (L. Vegas) - 3:54
"Chance To See" (P. Vegas) - 4:33
"Red And Blue" (L. Vegas) - 2:41
"Suite Mode (Instrumental)" (P. Vegas/L. Vegas/R. A. Bellamy/P. DePoe) - 8:17

Side four
"(I Can't) Handle It" (L. Vegas) - 5:35
"I'm A Man (Instrumental)" (L. Vegas) - 2:57
"Danse Calinda" (P. Vegas) - 2:41
"Things Go Better ... (Instrumental)" (P. Vegas/L. Vegas/R. A. Bellamy/P. DePoe) - 7:40

Track listing European single album

Side one
"Prehistoric Rhythm" (L.Vegas) – 3:50
"Crazy Cajun Cakewalk Band" (L. Vegas/P. Vegas/J. Ford) – 3:06
"Niki Hokey" (L. Vegas/P. Vegas/J. Ford) – 3:17
"Minor Seven Heaven" (L. Vegas) - 4:17
"Things Go Better ... (Instrumental)" (P. Vegas/L. Vegas/R. A. Bellamy/P. DePoe) - 7:40

Side two
"Night Come Down" (L. Vegas) – 3:53
"Tennessee Girl" (L. Vegas) – 2:27
"Jambone (Instrumental)" (P. Vegas/L. Vegas/R. A. Bellamy/P. DePoe) – 7:50
"Rebecca" (L. Vegas) – 3:02
"Danse Calinda" (P. Vegas) - 2:41
"Red And Blue" (L. Vegas) - 2:41

2007 CD Reissue
"Crazy Cajun Cakewalk Band" 3:08 
"Prehistoric Rhythm" 3:58 
"Niki Hokey"  3:17 
"Promise I Won't Let It Show"  3:07 
"Minor Seven Heaven"  4:21 
"Night Come Down"  3:53 
"Tennessee Girl"  2:25 
"Rebecca"  3:05 
"Jambone" (Instrumental) 7:48 
"Little Girl"  3:57 
"Chance to See"  4:32 
"Red and Blue"  2:44 
"Suite Mode" (Instrumental) 8:22 
"(I Can't) Handle It"  5:36 
"I'm a Man" (Instrumental) 2:57 
"Danse Calinda"  2:45 
"Things Go Better..." (Instrumental) 7:34

Personnel
 Lolly Vegas – lead guitar, vocals
 Tony Bellamy – rhythm guitar, vocals
 Patrick Vegas – bass, vocals
 Pete DePoe – drums, percussion

References

1970 debut albums
Redbone (band) albums
Epic Records albums